Network SouthCentral (NSC)  was a shadow franchise that existed from 4 February 1994 to 13 October 1996, when Connex South Central took over the running of the franchise. The franchise is now part of the Thameslink, Southern and Great Northern franchise operated by Govia Thameslink Railway under the Southern brand. As with all shadow franchises, Network SouthCentral was a wholly owned subsidiary of the British Railways Board.

Origins
In the lead up to the privatisation of British Rail, Network SouthEast was divided into a series of shadow franchises. Network SouthCentral was formed in February 1994.

Geographical Area
Network SouthCentral covered most of Sussex and parts of East Surrey. The core of NSC's operations was the Brighton Main Line, with most other NSC mainline services utilising some part of this alignment. The rough boundaries of the NSC operations were from Hastings in the east to Portsmouth in the west, although services operated by the company did extend further on both sides to Southampton along the West Coastway line in the west, and as the sole operator of the Marshlink line from Hastings to Ashford via Rye.

In London, the company served two major mainline terminals; London Victoria and Charing Cross. NSC's suburban services concentrated on the area directly to the south of these two stations, with routes serving most of south London, including Clapham Junction, Peckham, Tattenham Corner, East Croydon, Caterham, Sutton and Crystal Palace.

The main former Network SouthEast "sub-sectors" that came under the jurisdiction of NSC were the Sussex Coast, Oxted, South London and Marshlink lines.

Stock
During the short time in which NSC existed as an active train operating company, the company ordered no new rolling stock, nor received any new trains that had been ordered, though not delivered, before Network SouthEast handed over operations to NSC. However, the company operated the following types of locomotive, EMU and DEMU:

Livery
NSC branding was standard Network SouthEast lettering and design, but with the word "SouthCentral" in dark blue replacing the word "SouthEast" on leaflets, platforms and stock. The Network SouthEast "rhombus" red, blue and grey logo remained part of NSC's corporate image. Not all stock received NSC branding—the chief units to receive such treatment were NSC's express units—the Class 319s, 421s and 422s in the main being treated. As under NSE, the main corporate colour of Network SouthCentral was red, which was applied to all manner of things from rubbish bins to lamp-posts.

The Cowden rail accident
The only major accident that occurred on the NSC network was the Cowden rail crash when, on 15 October 1994, the driver of a Class 205 failed to see a red signal (this was believed to have been caused by fog), and drove the unit on to a single track section of the Uckfield line, where it collided with a train travelling in the opposite direction. Five people, including the erroneous driver were killed, and thirteen more were severely injured.

Buyout
On 13 October 1996, the franchise was privatised with Connex South Central taking over. The first unit to lose its NSC/NSE colours was  456024, which officially launched the new franchise.

References

Post-privatisation British railway companies
Railway companies established in 1994
Railway companies disestablished in 1996
Railway operators in London
1994 establishments in England
1996 disestablishments in England